Filippo Oliana (born 30 June 1999) is an Italian football player.

Club career
He is a product of Sampdoria youth teams and started playing for their Under-19 squad in the 2016–17 season.

On 11 July 2018, he joined Serie C club Albissola on a season-long loan. He made his Serie C debut for Albissola on 4 November 2018 in a game against Carrarese as a starter.

On 29 January 2020, he moved to Monopoli until the end of the season.

References

External links
 

1999 births
Footballers from Genoa
Living people
Italian footballers
Association football defenders
Serie C players
Albissola 2010 players
Rimini F.C. 1912 players
S.S. Monopoli 1966 players